Gransee is a town in the Oberhavel district, in Brandenburg, Germany. It is situated 20 km south of Fürstenberg/Havel, and 55 km northwest of Berlin.
An important monument in the centre of town is the cast-iron and stone Memorial to Queen Luise (Luisendenkmal), which was designed by the German architect Karl Friedrich Schinkel in the neo-gothic style.

A sport airfield is situated in the eastern part of the town. It is one of the major drop zones in the vicinity of Berlin.

Demography

Local council
The local council has 19 members:
 Christian Democratic Union: 5 seats
 Social Democratic Party of Germany: 5 seats
 The Left: 3 seats
 Voters association Gransee: 3 seats
 Voters association Citizens for Gransee: 2 seats
 Mayor: 1 seat
Local elections in Brandenburg May 25, 2014

Photogallery

People 
 Erdmann Copernicus (died 1573), German scholar, not related to the astronomer
 Emma Trosse (1863-1949), German teacher and poet

See also
 Battle of Gransee (1316)
Gransee und Gemeinden

References

Localities in Oberhavel